Zsolt Szokol (born 16 March 1990) is a Hungarian professional footballer who plays for Nyíregyháza. Although uncommon for defenders, Szokol is said to be one of the fastest players of his generation.

Club career
On 18 February 2019, Vasas SC announced, that Szokol would continue his career at FC United Zürich in Switzerland. In the summer 2019, he returned tu Hungary and joined Sényő FC.

International career
In September 2010, he debuted for Hungary, playing in an under-21 against Wales U21.

Club statistics

Updated to games played as of 9 December 2014.

References

External links
HLSZ 
MLSZ 

1990 births
Living people
People from Békéscsaba
Hungarian footballers
Hungary youth international footballers
Hungary under-21 international footballers
Hungarian expatriate footballers
Association football midfielders
Újpest FC players
Békéscsaba 1912 Előre footballers
Nyíregyháza Spartacus FC players
Vasas SC players
Nemzeti Bajnokság I players
Nemzeti Bajnokság II players
Hungarian expatriate sportspeople in Switzerland
Expatriate footballers in Switzerland
Sportspeople from Békés County
21st-century Hungarian people